Krysti Mistrz (born December 25, 1973) is an American former pornographic actress.

Porn career
Myst was working as a dental assistant in Los Angeles when she decided to get into the adult entertainment industry. She did a cover shoot for Hustler magazine and layouts for High Society and New Rave before making the jump into adult films in 1995.

Mistrz's best known films include the Buffy the Vampire Layer series of horror parodies. Buffy Down Under (1996), from that series, produced by David Haines, was the highest selling Australian produced adult film of all time.

She won the 2001 AVN Award for Best Anal Sex Scene – Video for a gang bang scene with urophagia in the film In The Days of Whore (Extreme Associates). Myst had broken down on the set and wanted to walk off the film and quit the business rather than complete her scene.

Pro wrestling career
She made a move into professional wrestling by joining Xtreme Pro Wrestling in 1999 and feuded with Lizzy Borden. She was present for an incident which took place at Extreme Championship Wrestling's HeatWave 2000 PPV. Several XPW wrestlers attended the ECW event and an altercation ensued between XPW and ECW performers. Much of ECW's locker room ran to ringside to escort their XPW counterparts out of the building.

Myst went on to become part of the Wrestling Vixxxens website with Tammy Lynn Sytch and Missy Hyatt in 2001.

Retirement
In January 2001, she left the industry to raise a child. In a 2005 interview, she described herself as a "full time mom," and a fan of X-Men comic books.

Awards and nominations

Notes

External links 

 
 
 
 

1973 births
American female adult models
American pornographic film actresses
Living people
People from Simi Valley, California
Pornographic film actors from California
Professional wrestling managers and valets
21st-century American women